Jean V d'Hangest et d'Avesnecourt (c. 1350 - 25 October 1415) was a consular to the Grand Chamberlain of France and Governor of Brittany. He died at the Battle of Agincourt.

Career 
In 1405, he was taken prisoner at Mercq near Calais along with David de Rambures.

References 

14th-century births
1415 deaths
French nobility